The Matthiesen Gallery is an art gallery in St James's, London, England, founded in 1978 by Patrick Matthiesen, son of Francis Matthiesen, an art dealer of Berlin and London. It operates as both a commercial gallery and an art museum.

The gallery is located at 7-8 Mason Yard, Duke Street St James's.

An earlier Matthiesen Gallery was operated by Francis, first in Berlin, then in London, after he fled Nazi Germany.

References

External links 

 

Art galleries established in 1978
Art galleries in London
Tourist attractions in the City of Westminster
1978 establishments in England